Mill Creek High School is a high school in Hoschton, Georgia, United States. It serves the unincorporated area of Hamilton Mill, Gwinnett County, a suburb of Atlanta, as well as Braselton. It also serves unincorporated areas (not city limits) such as zip codes 30548, 30019, 30542, 30517 and 30519. It has 3,997 students, and the most recent attendance counts have named it the largest school in Georgia. It is fed only by Frank N. Osborne Middle School, as Glenn C. Jones Middle School now feeds into Seckinger High School, opened in 2022. 

Mill Creek was named for the 4th consecutive year as one of the schools in the top 5% in the country with regard to academics and test results. 

In August 2004, Mill Creek opened with 2,500 students. It now enrolls a little under 4,000 students, and 292 staff members. It has 53 trailers around the school to provide enough space for its many students. By 2018 the school, which had 3,724 students that year, had been consistently the largest high school in Georgia by student population.

Mill Creek has over 100 student clubs.

Yearbook
The Mill Creek yearbook, The Accipiter, is a member of the National Scholastic Press Association and the Computer Press Association.

Newspaper
The Mill Creek High school newspaper has won many awards. The newspaper's original name was The Current, with the slogan, "The Current, where the news always flows." This title only lasted from the opening of Mill Creek in 2004 until 2005. Mill Creek's mascot is the Hawk, so the paper was then titled The Hawk Print.  In the statewide Journalism Banquet of 2007, The Hawk Print won first place in "Best Art or Illustration," "Best Photography," "Best News Section," and "Most Improved." It is now known as the Mill Creek Chronicle.

Notable alumni
 Chris Fronzak, lead singer for the metalcore band Attila
 Ryan Robinson, NFL football player

References

External links 
 Mill Creek High School

Public high schools in Georgia (U.S. state)
Schools in Gwinnett County, Georgia
2004 establishments in Georgia (U.S. state)
Educational institutions established in 2004